A special election was held in  in 1807 to fill a vacancy left by the resignation of Barnabas Bidwell (DR), who had been appointed Massachusetts Attorney General on July 13 of that year.

Election results

Bacon took his seat on November 2, 1807.

See also
List of special elections to the United States House of Representatives

References

United States House of Representatives 1807 12
Massachusetts 1807 12
Massachusetts 1807 12
1807 12
Massachusetts 12
1807 Massachusetts elections